Xanthocnemis zealandica, commonly known as common redcoat damselfly, red damselfly, or red coat damselfly, is the most common native New Zealand damselfly. Adult damselflies are often seen flying around vegetation close to streams.

X. zealandica has a 2–3 year life cycle; the shorter one was observed near sea level while the longer one was characteristic to a mid-elevation site ( above sea level). Some individuals at the lowland site may even complete their life cycle in one year. X. zealandica larvae are widespread across New Zealand, occurring in rocky and weedy streams and ponds. The larvae of the red damselfly are identified by their pointed tail gills and long hairs by the tip.

References

Coenagrionidae
Odonata of New Zealand
Endemic fauna of New Zealand
Insects described in 1873
Taxa named by Robert McLachlan (entomologist)
Endemic insects of New Zealand